The Edmonton Remand Centre (ERC) is a correctional facility in Goodridge Corners, Edmonton, Alberta, Canada. The facility is operated by the Ministry of Justice and Solicitor General of Alberta. The original correctional facility originally opened in 1979, after overcrowding and additional bed space required a second facility was proposed and completed in 2012. The new facility named the New Edmonton Remand Centre (NERC) opened on April 12, 2013, and is currently Canada's largest prison.

History

Original facility
The original 12-storey Edmonton Remand Centre was built in 1979. The facility was located in downtown Edmonton and cost $138.0 million in 1979. The original set capacity was 388; however, the facility population grew to 800 in early 2012. The original facility closed in April 2013.

New facility
Proposals to build a new facility originated in the early 2000s after overcrowding in the original facility. In 2007 construction began on the new  Edmonton Remand Centre with a cost of $580.0 million. The newer facility was completed in fall of 2012, with the new prison operating in spring 2013. The newer facility features a 2,000-inmate capacity and new security technologies. The new facility structure aimed at targeting Leadership in Energy and Environmental Design (LEED) silver certifications. The New Remand Centre is the largest in Canada by area and capacity, but is not the largest by number of inmates currently serving time.

See also
Edmonton Institution, a federal maximum security prison also in Edmonton.

References

External links
 Government of Alberta - Edmonton Remand Centre

Prisons in Alberta
Buildings and structures in Edmonton